King Salman Global Academy for Arabic Language (KSAA), initially as the King Salman International Complex for the Arabic Language, is an international language complex based in Riyadh, Saudi Arabia which was established for the promotion of Arabic language. Founded in September 2020 through a Council of Ministers decree, it is affiliated to the country's Ministry of Culture.

References 

Organisations based in Riyadh
2020 establishments in Saudi Arabia
Arabic lexicology and lexicography
Arabic language
Education in Saudi Arabia